Ponderosa is a census-designated place (CDP) in Sandoval County, New Mexico, United States. The population was 383 as of New Mexico's 2015 Census. It is part of the Albuquerque Metropolitan Statistical Area.

Geography
Ponderosa is located at  (35.668305, -106.664462).

Demographics

As of the census of 2015, there are 383 people, 171 households, and 96 families. The population density is 42.4 people per square mile (16.4/km). There are 198 housing units. The racial makeup of the 2000 CDP was 29.68% White, 0.32% African American, 4.52% Native American, 0.32% Asian, 0.32% Pacific Islander, 59.68% from other races, and 5.16% from two or more races. Hispanic or Latino of any race were 64.52% of the population. The 2015 Diversity Index is 71.

In 2000, there were 112 households, out of which 42.0% had children under the age of 18 living with them, 70.5% were married couples living together, 5.4% had a female householder with no husband present, and 21.4% were non-families. 17.9% of all households were made up of individuals, and 5.4% had someone living alone who was 65 years of age or older. The average household size was 2.77 and the average family size was 3.16.

In the CDP, the population was spread out, with 28.1% under the age of 18, 7.1% from 18 to 24, 21.0% from 25 to 44, 35.2% from 45 to 64, and 8.7% who were 65 years of age or older. The median age was 41 years. For every 100 females, there were 109.5 males. For every 100 females age 18 and over, there were 100.9 males.

In 2015 the median income for a household is $60,156.  In the 2000 CDP the median income for a family was $45,417. Males had a median income of $39,300 versus $28,182 for females. The per capita income for the CDP is $33,781. In 2000, about 14.5% of families and 19.8% of the population were below the poverty line, including 32.0% of those under age 18 and none of those age 65 or over.

Education
Most of Ponderosa is within the Jemez Valley Public Schools school district. A portion extends into Bernalillo Public Schools.

Local attractions
Ponderosa Valley Vineyards & Winery

References

Census-designated places in Sandoval County, New Mexico
Census-designated places in New Mexico
Albuquerque metropolitan area